Yang Wei or Wei Yang may refer to:

Shang Yang or Wei Yang (Chinese: 衞鞅; c. 390–338 BCE), ancient Chinese philosopher and politician
Yang Longyan (897–920) or Yang Wei (楊渭), King of Wu of the Five Dynasties and Ten Kingdoms Period
Yang Wei (engineer) (杨卫, born 1954), president of Zhejiang University
Yang Wei (aircraft designer) (杨伟, born 1963), Chinese aircraft designer
Wei Yang (biologist) (杨薇, born 1963), Chinese-American biologist
Wei Yang (urban designer) (born 1974), Chinese-British urban designer
Yang Wei (badminton) (杨维, born 1979), Chinese badminton player
Yang Wei (gymnast) (杨威, born 1980), Chinese gymnast
Chinese cruiser Yangwei, a late Qing-dynasty warship with the Beiyang Fleet